Wives of Men is a 1918 American silent drama film directed by John M. Stahl and starring Florence Reed. Stahl also wrote the screenplay with movie being produced by Grace Davison, who has a role in the film.

Cast
Florence Reed as Lucille Emerson
Frank R. Mills as James Randolph Emerson Jr (*this Frank Mills, a stage actor born 1870 died 1921)
Mr. Wokoff as James Randolph Emerson Sr.
Mathilde Brundage as Mrs. James Randolph Emerson Sr.
Edgar Lewis as Jim Hawkins
Charles Jackson as Charlie
Grace Davison as Grace
Bessie Mar English as Mary
Robert Lee Keeling as Paul Harrison

Preservation status
This film is now considered a lost film.

References

External links

lantern slide (State University of New York)(Wayback Machine)

1918 films
American silent feature films
Films directed by John M. Stahl
Films based on short fiction
1918 drama films
Silent American drama films
American black-and-white films
Lost American films
1918 lost films
Lost drama films
1910s American films